The Laohe Hill or Laoheshan is a hill located in  Hangzhou City, Zhejiang Province, People's Republic of China.

Introduction
It is on the northwest corner of West Lake and on the Yuquan Campus, Zhejiang University. It has an altitude of 156 meters and is covered by forests.

In 1936, at the foot of the hill, a very large neolithic site was discovered (mainly Liangzhu culture), so it's a very famous historic site of Hangzhou.

Laohe Hill is a literature topic often appearing in essays or poems by people who have visited Hangzhou and climbed on it.

References

Yuquan Campus, Zhejiang University